Vito Lucente (born 31 August 1971), known by his stage name Junior Jack, is an Italian house music producer and DJ based in Belgium.

Biography
In the early years, Vito Lucente produced several acid house and Eurodance projects, mostly in collaboration with Eric Imhauser. However, his more famous project was as producer of the synthpop/rap group Benny B, with vocalist Amid Gharbaoui, DJ Daddy K and dancer Serge "Perfect" Nuet. Lucente left the band after the second album, and he did not produce their last single.

Career
Vito Lucente resided in Belgium in his teen years. In 1995, he abandoned Eurodance and adopted the name "Mr. Jack" (which would later morph into Junior Jack), dabbling in house music. He entered the UK top 40 with the singles "My Feeling", "Thrill Me (Such a Thrill)", "E Samba", "Dare Me (Stupidisco)" and "Da Hype", the latter featuring vocals by Robert Smith from the Cure and uses samples from "I'm So Hot for You" by Bobby Orlando. His album Trust It was released to critical acclaim. "My Feeling" and "Stupidisco" were built around vocal samples from, respectively, "Saturday Love" by Alexander O'Neal and Cherrelle, and "Dare Me" by the Pointer Sisters. His latest single was a remake of "Dare Me (Stupidisco)", with vocals from Shena, which reached #20 in the UK Singles Chart on 25 February 2007

Lucente has also worked with disco artist Oliver Cheatham under the name Room 5, reaching number-one on the UK Singles Chart with the 2003 single "Make Luv" (which used samples from Cheatham's song "Get Down Saturday Night"). "Make Luv" ended up being certified platinum by BPI in 2022.

As a remixer, he has reworked tracks for artists such as Whitney Houston, Moby, Bob Sinclar and Utada. He has worked extensively in this area with partner Kid Creme.

Discography

Albums
1990 L'Album, as Benny B
1992 Perfect, Daddy K Et Moi, as Benny B
1992 Walakota, as Wamblee
2003 Music & You, as Room 5
2004 Trust It, as Junior Jack

Singles
Junior Jack

Room 5
2001 "Make Luv" (with Oliver Cheatham)
2003 "Make Luv" (re-release) (with Oliver Cheatham) #1 UK, #34 AUS
2003 "Music & You" (with Oliver Cheatham) #38 UK
2003 "Think About U"
2004 "U Got Me"
2005 "Make Luv (The 2005 Mixes)" (with Oliver Cheatham)

Mr Jack
1995 "Only House Muzik"
1996 "Wiggly World"
1997 "The Wiggly World 2 (Jack Is the One)" (with Brenda Edwards)
1997 "I Know" (with Olivier Gosseries)
1998 "Back from Hawaii EP" (with Olivier Gosseries)
1999 "Start!" (with Olivier Gosseries)
1999 "Only House Muzik - Remixes '99"
1999 "Voodoo Curse" (with Olivier Gosseries)

Benny B
 All are collaborations with Amid Gharbaoui, Daddy K and Richard Quyssens
1990 "Vous êtes fous !"
1990 "Qu'est-ce qu'on fait maintenant ?"
1991 "Dis-moi bébé"
1991 "Parce qu'on est jeunes"
1992 "Dix neuf huit..."
1992 "Est-ce que je peux"
1993 "Je t'aime à l'infini", with Eric Imhauser, Gregg Wakson, David Linx and François Gery

Latino Brothers productions
 All are collaborations with Terry Logist
1990 "Move It!", as One Shot
1993 "Don't Miss the Party", as One Shot
1993 "The Musik", as Latino Brothers
1994 "Can You See It", as Kaf'e
1994 "I'm in Love", as Fresh Mould
1995 "Come with Me", as Latino Brothers
1996 "Back in Town EP", as Kaf'e
1996 "Fantasy", as Kaf'e
1998 "Can You See It '98", as Kaf'e
2004 "Carnaval", as Latino Brothers

Hugh K.
 All are collaborations with Hugh Kanza and Eric Imhauser
1992 "Georgia On My Mind"
1993 "Shine On"
1994 "One More Time"
1995 "Shine On (Unreleased Dubs)"
1996 "Higher"

Other aliases
1990 "Cocco Di Mamma", as Don Vito
1990 "Mais Vous Etes Sottes", as Suzy D (with Richard Quyssens, François Gery and Alain Deproost)
1991 "No Name", as F&V (with Frank Sels)
1991 "Anitouni", as Wamblee (with Francesco Palmeri)
1991 "Wa Na Pi", as Warble (with Francesco Palmeri)
1992 "I'm Sorry (Désolé Madame)", as R.I.P. (with Richard Quyssens and Eric Imhauser)
1992 "Atomico", as Redline (with Eric Imhauser)
1992 "It's Time to Sleep", as Nitrogena (with Eric Imhauser)
1993 "Jumping", as Redline (with Eric Imhauser)
1993 "Get to You", as Logic Dream (with F. Spindler)
1994 "4 U/Just Deep", as Deep Walker
1994 "Strange Day", as Marocco
1994 "People", as Family Groove
1995 "Fuori uno", album released by EMI, as DON VITO, with the single "Grazie a chi".
2001 "We Loved", as E-People (with Frank de Gryse and C. Robert Walker)
2001 "Tool #1", as Private Tools (with Kid Creme)
2002 "Chasing", as Maphia Ltd. (with Kid Creme)
2003 "Hidden Sun/Good Times", as Soho
2003 "Excuse Me!", as Nu Rican Kidz
2003 "Hold Me Up", as Glory (with Frank de Gryse and Jocelyn Brown)
2005 "Tool #2", as Private Tools (with Kid Creme)

Production for other artists
1993 Bart Herman - "Metropool" (with Eric Imhauser)
1994 Bart Herman - "Waterman" (with Eric Imhauser)
1994 Daddy K - "Voulez-Vous Coucher Avec Moi?" (with Eric Imhauser)
1997 Traisey Elana Williams - "Feel the Fire" (with Frank Degrees)
1998 Shelly Dee - "Party"
1999 Jerome Prister - "Lovin' Right Now" (with Conga Squad)
2001 Dajae - "Everyday of My Life" (with Felix Da Housecat)

See also
List of number-one dance hits (United States)
List of artists who reached number one on the US Dance chart

References

Club DJs
House DJs
Remixers
Living people
1971 births
Italian house musicians
Belgian house musicians
Italian DJs
Belgian DJs
Belgian people of Italian descent
Electronic dance music DJs